James W. Johnson may refer to:

James Weldon Johnson (1871–1938), African-American figure in the Harlem Renaissance
James Wood Johnson (1856–1932), co-founder of the company Johnson and Johnson
Lefty Johnson (pitcher) (James W. Johnson), American baseball player of the 1930s